Soumen Roy is an Indian politician from Trinamool Congress who joined the party on September 4, 2021. He is a former BJP member. In May 2021, he was elected as a member of the West Bengal Legislative Assembly from Kaliaganj (constituency). He defeated Tapan Deb Singha of All India Trinamool Congress by 94,948 votes in 2021 West Bengal Assembly election.

References 

Living people
Year of birth missing (living people)
21st-century Indian politicians
People from Alipurduar district
Bharatiya Janata Party politicians from West Bengal
West Bengal MLAs 2021–2026
Trinamool Congress politicians